The Weßlinger See ( 'Lake Weßling') is the smallest lake in the Fünfseenland ( 'five lakes country') in Upper Bavaria. It is completely enclosed by the municipality of Weßling.

Overview 
Lake Weßling is a remnant of a kettle hole created during the Würm glaciation. It has no natural tributary, and due to the use of fertilizers in the catchment area it was close to becoming hypoxic in the 20th century. To counter this problem an oxygen pump was installed in the middle of the lake in the 1970s, which has significantly improved the ecologic balance.

Due to its small size and lack of a natural tributary, regionally it is usually one of the warmest lakes in summer and the first lake to freeze over in winter. Especially in summer this means the lake attracts numerous visitors from the Munich Metropolitan Region. Starting in the 19th century, the scenic setting within the Bavarian Alpine Foreland has also attracted several painters and sculptors (e.g. Carl Schuch, Pierre-Auguste Renoir, Wilhelm Trübner, see Gallery) to the town of Weßling

Gallery

See also
List of lakes in Bavaria

References

External links

Bathymetric map of Lake Weßling (in German)
Official information about Lake Weßling from the district of Starnberg (in German)

Lakes of Bavaria
Upper Bavaria